Joona Karevaara is a Finnish professional ice hockey forward who currently plays for Jokipojat of Mestis. He also used to play for HPK of the SM-liiga.

References

External links

Living people
HPK players
Jokipojat players
1987 births
Finnish ice hockey forwards
People from Hämeenlinna
Sportspeople from Kanta-Häme